The 2021 Volta a la Comunitat Valenciana (English: Tour of the Valencian Community) was a road cycling stage race that took place from 14 to 18 April 2021 in the Spanish autonomous community of Valencia. It was the 72nd edition of the Volta a la Comunitat Valenciana and a 2.Pro event on the 2021 UCI Europe Tour and the 2021 UCI ProSeries calendars.

The race was originally scheduled for 3 to 7 February, but due to a spike in COVID-19 cases in the Valencia area leading up to the race, it had to be postponed to 14 to 18 April.

Teams 
Four UCI WorldTeams, eight UCI ProTeams, and three UCI Continental teams make up the fifteen teams that participated in the race. Due to the race's postponement, many of the teams that were initially expected to participate chose not to do so with other race conflicts. As a result, race organizers allowed teams to field up to nine riders instead of the usual maximum of seven for a stage race. Two teams ( and ) each entered six riders, five teams (and ) each entered seven riders, three teams (and ) each entered eight riders, and five teams (and ) each entered nine riders. Of the 116 riders who started the race, 107 finished.

UCI WorldTeams

 
 
 
 

UCI ProTeams

 
 
 
 
 
 
 
 

UCI Continental Teams

Route

Stages

Stage 1 
14 April 2021 — Elche to Ondara,

Stage 2 
15 April 2021 — Alicante to Alicante,

Stage 3 
16 April 2021 — Torrent to Dos Aguas (Alto de la Reina),

Stage 4 
17 April 2021 — Xilxes to Almenara,  (ITT)

Stage 5 
18 April 2021 — Paterna to Valencia,

Classification leadership table 

 On stage 2, John Degenkolb, who was second in the points classification, wore the orange jersey, because first-placed Miles Scotson wore the yellow jersey as the leader of the general classification. For the same reason, on stage 4, Simone Consonni wore the orange jersey on behalf of Enric Mas, while on stage 5, Miles Scotson did the same on behalf of Stefan Küng.

Final classification standings

General classification

Points classification

Mountains classification

Young rider classification

Team classification

Notes

References

External links 
 

2021
Volta a la Comunitat Valenciana
Volta a la Comunitat Valenciana
Volta a la Comunitat Valenciana
Volta a la Comunitat Valenciana
Volta a la Comunitat Valenciana